Elena Pavlovna Muratova (18 January 1874 – 1 May 1921) was a Moscow-born stage actress and reader in drama, associated with the Moscow Art Theatre which she joined in 1901 and stayed with for the rest of her life. She was the first performer of the parts of Akulina Ivanovna (The Philistines, by Gorky), Vasilissa (The Lower Depths), Charlotte (The Cherry Orchard) and Lizaveta Bogdanovna (A Month in the Country). Muratova was a respected and much admired pedagogue. "Her most popular parts were those of the governesses and it so happened the Elena Pavlovna's parallel life in theatre centered around tutoring young generations of the MAT actors," according to Vasily Luzhsky.

References 

Actresses from the Russian Empire
Actresses from Moscow
1874 births
1921 deaths